The Americas Zone was one of three zones of regional competition in the 2014 Fed Cup.

Group I 
 Venue: Yacht y Golf Club Paraguayo, Lambaré, Paraguay (Clay)
 Dates: 5–8 February

The seven teams were divided into one pool of three and one pool of four teams. The two pool winners took part in play-offs to determine the nation advancing to the World Group II play-offs. The nations finishing last in their pools took part in relegation play-offs, with the losing nation was relegated to Group II for 2015.

Pools

Play-offs 

  was promoted to World Group II play-offs

Group II
 Venue: Palmas Athletic Club, Humacao, Puerto Rico (hard, outdoors)
 Date: 7–12 April

The twelve teams were divided into four pools of three teams. The four pool winners took part in play-offs to determine the two nations being promoted to Group I.

Pools

Play-offs

References 

 Fed Cup Result, 2014 Americas Group I
 Fed Cup Result, 2014 Americas Group II

External links 
 Fed Cup website

 
Sport in Lambaré
Tennis tournaments in Paraguay